Sahantaha is a rural municipality in northern Madagascar. It belongs to the district of Antalaha, which is a part of Sava Region. The municipality has a populations of 6,863 inhabitants (2019).

It is situated on the coast, some 22 km south of Antalaha.

Agriculture
The agriculture is mainly substancial: rice, manioc, banana, sugar cane and coco nuts. Next to it also vanilla, cloves and coffee is planted.

Tourism
 Masoala National Park.

References 

Populated places in Sava Region